The Gabonese Republican Guard is an independent military formation in the Republic of Gabon that is responsible for protection of government officials and buildings. It is the most powerful security unit in Gabon and is responsible for ensuring internal security. It is a directly reporting unit of the National Gendarmerie.

Description
The Republican Guard was organized as the Presidential Guard from 1960 to 1995. President Omar Bongo recruited members of his own ethnic group to the Presidential Guard. The GR is committed daily some 750 people for security missions and 150 for missions normal. Since the death of Bongo in June 2009, the Republican Guard began to maintain a regular presence at every major intersection in Libreville and Bord de Mer, with French advisors being present at the larger intersections. It has close contact in the United States Africa Command East Africa Response Force.

In late 2015, the Republican Guard acquired a Gulfstream G650 for VIP transport.

Coup attempt 
In 2019, the Republican Guard was at the center of a coup d'état attempt to oust President Ali Bongo's government. Military officers led by Lieutenant Kelly Ondo Obiang announced that they had ousted President Bongo. It deployed armoured vehicles such as Nexter Aravis MRAPs throughout the capital.

The coup was put down by 10:30 am after the Gendarmerie Intervention Group assaulted the Radio Télévision Gabonaise, which was the headquarters of the pro-coup forces.

Structure
The Republican Guard has the following structure:

 Cabinet Com Chef
 Administrative and Financial Services Department
 B1
 B3
 B4
 Directorate General of Special Services
 Logistics Department
 Auto Technical Service
 Regular
 Directorate of Military Health
 Parachute Intervention Group
 Presidential Aerial Group
 Armored Intervention Group
 Material Service
 Fire Section
 Nautical Section
 Libreville Instruction Center
 Signal Service
 1st Company
 2nd Company
 3rd Company
 4th Company
 Franceville Detachment
 Leconi Detachment
 Close Security Company
 Barracks
 Military Band
 General Corps Service
 Special Response Service

Commanders
Colonel Brice Clotaire Oligui Nguema (3 March 2020–Present)

See also
Ivorian Republican Guard
Republican Guard (Central African Republic)
Republican Guard (Guinea)

Sources

Military of Gabon
Military units and formations established in 1960
1960 establishments in Gabon